Indix was a company based in Seattle, Washington, in the United States that was offering a cloud-based product information platform. It did also built a broad and deep product catalog to enable mobile and desktop apps and websites to become product-aware. Indix provided access to APIs that enable developers to build product-aware applications. The big data startup was headquartered in Seattle with a product development office in Chennai and was founded in 2010 by former Microsoft executive Sanjay Parthasarathy.

Background 
Indix's CEO and founder is Sanjay Parthasarathy. Parthasarathy left Microsoft in 2009, where he worked for 19 years in an executive capacity, notably starting and running the company's Developer & Platform Evangelism Division from 2000 to 2007. On retiring from Microsoft, he moved his family to India where he intended to launch a software company that would tackle key business problems facing companies in the changing world of commerce. The company raised a successful angel investment round in the spring of 2012 and Parthasarathy subsequently established its headquarters in Seattle.

Other co-founders of Indix include Sridhar Venkatesh, Rajesh Muppalla, Satya Kaliki and Jonah Stephen Jermiah.

Indix was acquired by Avalara, a provider of tax compliance automation software on February 6, 2019.

Services 
Indix's services are centered on proprietary algorithms that structure crawled product data and a data-as-a-service business model.

The database offers coverage for most consumer retail product categories. The database also includes many industrial and business-to-business products. Indix provides brands and retailers with access to data such as specifications, facets, availability, assortment, promotions, and real-time pricing information. Indix's infinite product catalog helps all client-facing digital media and environments become more product-aware.

API 
The Indix Product API utilizes a representational state transfer (RESTful) interface with 20+ endpoints including brand, store, category, product search, single product details, and product price history. The API is intended to function as a tool for product assortment, price, catalog enrichment, etc. optimization to medium and large sized brands and retailers. It is also meant to help developers build product-aware applications that connect consumers with the right product at the right time.

Funding 
In 2013 Indix raised a series A round of funding from Nexus Venture Partners and Avalon Ventures. Last year the company raised $8.5 million in its series A-1 round. Additional angel funding has come from Venky Harinarayan, S. Somasegar, and Anand Rajaraman of @WalmartLabs.

In 2015 Indix raised $15 million in a Series B round led by Nokia Growth Partners and included participation from Nexus Venture Partners and Avalon Ventures.

References

External links 
 

American companies established in 2010
Product intelligence